A sauce is a liquid condiment or accompaniment to food. 
Sauce or The Sauce may also refer to:

Geography
 Sauce Department, Corrientes Province, Argentina
 Sauce, Corrientes, a town, capital of the department 
 El Sauce, El Salvador, a municipality
 El Sauce, León, Nicaragua, a town and municipality
 Sauce District, San Martin Province, Peru
 Lake Sauce, Peru
 Sawsi, also spelled Sauce, a mountain in Peru
 Sauce, Uruguay, a city and municipality in the Canelones Department

Music
 The Sauce (Eddie Spaghetti album), the first solo album by Eddie Spaghetti of The Supersuckers
 "Sauce", a song on the 2018 album Man of the Woods by Justin Timberlake
 "The Sauce", a song from the 2000 album AOI: Bionix by De La Soul
 "SAUCE!", a song from the 2019 album Members Only, Vol. 4 by late rapper XXXTENTACION

People
 Ángel Sauce (1911–1995), Venezuelan composer and violinist
 Sauce Gardner (born 2000), American football player
 Daniel Merrett (born 1984), former Australian rules footballer nicknamed "Sauce"
 Curtis "Sauce" Wilson, a member of the now-defunct R&B group Somethin' for the People

Other uses
 Standard Architecture for Universal Comment Extensions, or SAUCE, a software protocol
 Sauce, a colloquial term for alcoholic beverages
 Internet slang for "source", often used when requesting the source of an image or other posted material
 Battle of El Sauce, a 1932 battle during the American occupation of Nicaragua
 The Sauce, a television series that aired on Fuse TV from 2007 to 2008

See also 
 Laguna del Sauce, a lake in Uruguay
 Saus, Catalonia, Spain
 Source (disambiguation)

Lists of people by nickname